The Dymaxion map or Fuller map is a projection of a world map onto the surface of an icosahedron, which can be unfolded and flattened to two dimensions. The flat map is heavily interrupted in order to preserve shapes and sizes.

The projection was invented by Buckminster Fuller. The March 1, 1943, edition of Life magazine included a photographic essay titled "Life Presents R. Buckminster Fuller's Dymaxion World". The article included several examples of its use together with a pull-out section that could be assembled as a "three-dimensional approximation of a globe or laid out as a flat map, with which the world may be fitted together and rearranged to illuminate special aspects of its geography." Fuller applied for a patent in the United States in February 1944, showing a projection onto a cuboctahedron, which he called "dymaxion". The patent was issued in January 1946.

In 1954, Fuller and cartographer Shoji Sadao produced the Airocean World Map, a version of the Dymaxion map that used a modified but mostly regular icosahedron as the base for the projection. The version most commonly referred to today, it depicts Earth's continents as "one island", or nearly contiguous land masses.

The Dymaxion projection is intended only for representations of the entire globe. It is not a gnomonic projection, whereby global data expands from the center point of a tangent facet outward to the edges. Instead, each triangle edge of the Dymaxion map matches the scale of a partial great circle on a corresponding globe, and other points within each facet shrink toward its middle, rather than enlarging to the peripheries. Fuller's 1980 version of the Dymaxion map was the first definition and use of a mathematical transformation process to make the map. It is a polyhedral map projection.

The name Dymaxion was applied by Fuller to several of his inventions.

Properties 
Though neither conformal nor equal-area, Fuller claimed that his map had several advantages over other projections for world maps.

It has less distortion of relative size of areas, most notably when compared to the Mercator projection; and less distortion of shapes of areas, notably when compared to the Gall–Peters projection. Other compromise projections attempt a similar trade-off.

More unusually, the Dymaxion map does not have any "right way up". Fuller argued that in the universe there is no "up" and "down", or "north" and "south": only "in" and "out". Gravitational forces of the stars and planets created "in", meaning "towards the gravitational center", and "out", meaning "away from the gravitational center". He attributed the north-up-superior/south-down-inferior presentation of most other world maps to cultural bias.

Fuller intended the map to be unfolded in different ways to emphasize different aspects of the world. Peeling the triangular faces of the icosahedron apart in one way results in an icosahedral net that shows an almost contiguous land mass comprising all of Earth's continents – not groups of continents divided by oceans. Peeling the solid apart in a different way presents a view of the world dominated by connected oceans surrounded by land.

Showing the continents as "one island earth" also helped Fuller explain, in his book Critical Path, the journeys of early seafaring people, who were in effect using prevailing winds to circumnavigate this world island.

However, the Dymaxion map can also prove difficult to use. It is, for example, confusing to describe the four cardinal directions and locate geographic coordinates. The awkward shape of the map may be counterintuitive to most people trying to use it. For example, tracing a path from India to Chile may be confusing. Depending on how the map is projected, land masses and oceans are often divided into several pieces.

Impact 
A 1967 Jasper Johns painting, Map (Based on Buckminster Fuller's Dymaxion Airocean World), depicting a Dymaxion map, hangs in the permanent collection of the Museum Ludwig in Cologne.

The World Game, a collaborative simulation game in which players attempt to solve world problems, is played on a 70-by-35-foot Dymaxion map.

In 2013, to commemorate the 70th anniversary of the publication of the Dymaxion map in Life magazine, the Buckminster Fuller Institute announced the "Dymax Redux", a competition for graphic designers and visual artists to re-imagine the Dymaxion map. The competition received over 300 entries from 42 countries.

In 2019, Daniel "daan" Strebe used mathematical work on conformal projections by Oscar S. Adams and L. P. Lee to create a conformal version of the Dymaxion projection. In 2020, the Build the Earth project used Strebe's work to create a map projection for their work known as the Modified Airocean. This map projection provides an extremely low amount of distortion of both shapes and sizes on land, at the cost of heavily distorting the oceans. Unlike the Dymaxion, Modified Airocean is not intended to be unfolded into a 3D object like an icosahedron, and has its continents placed such that it looks somewhat similar to an equirectangular projection.

See also
 List of map projections
 Authagraph projection, inspired by Fuller, 1999
 Peirce quincuncial projection, 1879
 Polyhedral map projection, earliest known is by Leonardo da Vinci, 1514

References

External links 

 DYMAX REDUX, a design competition for a fresh take on the dymaxion projection by the Buckminster Fuller Institute
 Fuller Map homepage
 Dymaxion Project Animation
 Icosahedron and Fuller maps
 Dynamically generated maps based on the Dymaxion projection

Buckminster Fuller
Map projections
1943 introductions